Jacques Perrier (28 February 1929 – 4 May 1989) was a French cross-country skier who competed in the 1950s. He finished 33rd in the 18 km event at the 1952 Winter Olympics in Oslo.

External links
18 km Olympic cross-country results: 1948-52
  

1929 births
1989 deaths
French male cross-country skiers
Cross-country skiers at the 1952 Winter Olympics
Olympic cross-country skiers of France
20th-century French people